Anthony Mark Johnson (born October 2, 1974) is an American former professional basketball player who last played with the Orlando Magic of the National Basketball Association (NBA). At , he played the point guard position. He found success in pro basketball, becoming the first NBA D-League player to participate in an NBA Finals. A native of Charleston, South Carolina, Johnson played college basketball at the College of Charleston and was drafted in the NBA in 1997.

Early life
After leading R.B. Stall High School to the South Carolina AAA football championship, Johnson received a basketball scholarship at the College of Charleston, where his older brother Steven was a standout years earlier. By his senior year, he developed into one of the top players in the Trans America Athletic Conference, named conference player of the year in 1997, while leading the College of Charleston to an NCAA basketball tournament first round victory over the University of Maryland at the Memphis regional.

NBA career
He was the first player in College of Charleston history selected in the NBA Draft, picked by the Sacramento Kings in the late second round. In the 1997-98 season, he started 62 games, averaging 7.5 points per game. Over the next several seasons, he played with the Atlanta Hawks, Orlando Magic, Cleveland Cavaliers, and New Jersey Nets. On December 7, 2001, Johnson signed with the NBDL team Mobile Revelers and played there for 15 games, averaging 11.9 points per game.

In the 2003-2004 season, he was signed by the Indiana Pacers, where he had a career resurgence, averaging nearly 22 minutes per game and scoring 6.5 points per game. Prior to the 2004-2005 season, the longtime NBA journeyman earned his first long term contract, a four-year deal with the Indiana Pacers.

He drew a five-game suspension from the NBA as a result of his actions in the Pacers–Pistons brawl which broke out at The Palace of Auburn Hills near the end of a November 19, 2004 game between the two teams.

During the 2004-2005 season, Pacers' starting point guard, Jamaal Tinsley, missed extended periods of time due to injury, which led to a starting role for Anthony Johnson during much to the latter half of that season.

In the 2006 NBA Playoffs, Johnson scored a career-high 40 points against the New Jersey Nets in Game 6 of the series. Despite his heroics, the Pacers lost 96-90, and the series 4-2 to the Nets.

In the 2006 off-season, Johnson was traded to the Dallas Mavericks in exchange for guard Darrell Armstrong, and forwards Josh Powell and Rawle Marshall.

On February 22, 2007, Johnson was traded back to the Atlanta Hawks in exchange for a second round draft choice. It was Johnson's third stint with the team.

On February 16, 2008 the Sacramento Kings acquired Johnson along with Shelden Williams, Tyronn Lue, and Lorenzen Wright in exchange for Mike Bibby.

On July 15, 2008, Johnson signed a two-year contract worth $3.8 million with the Orlando Magic. It was his second stint in Orlando.  In two seasons with the Magic, he played in 111 games, starting 12, and participated in the 2009 NBA Finals. His contract expired at the conclusion of the 2009-10 NBA season, making him a free agent.

NBA career statistics

Regular season

|-
| align="left" | 
| align="left" | Sacramento
| 77 || 62 || 29.4 || .371 || .328 || .727 || 2.2 || 4.3 || .8 || .1 || 7.5
|-
| align="left" | 
| align="left" | Atlanta
| 49 || 2 || 18.1 || .404 || .263 || .695 || 1.5 || 2.2 || .7 || .1 || 5.0
|-
| align="left" | 
| align="left" | Atlanta
| 38 || 2 || 11.1 || .350 || .167 || .792 || 1.0 || 1.6 || .6 || .1 || 2.4
|-
| align="left" | 
| align="left" | Orlando
| 18 || 4 || 11.9 || .426 || .200 || .600 || .7 || .7 || .6 || .1 || 3.4
|-
| align="left" | 
| align="left" | Atlanta
| 25 || 0 || 11.2 || .366 || .000 || .706 || .9 || 1.4 || .7 || .2 || 2.6
|-
| align="left" | 
| align="left" | Cleveland
| 28 || 0 || 8.3 || .333 || .500 || .688 || .8 || 1.6 || .2 || .0 || 2.4
|-
| align="left" | 
| align="left" | New Jersey
| 34 || 0 || 10.8 || .411 || .333 || .640 || .9 || 1.4 || .9 || .0 || 2.8
|-
| align="left" | 
| align="left" | New Jersey
| 66 || 2 || 12.8 || .446 || .371 || .689 || 1.2 || 1.3 || .6 || .1 || 4.1
|-
| align="left" | 
| align="left" | Indiana
| 73 || 7 || 21.9 || .406 || .336 || .798 || 1.8 || 2.8 || .9 || .1 || 6.2
|-
| align="left" | 
| align="left" | Indiana
| 63 || 36 || 27.7 || .445 || .380 || .752 || 2.8 || 4.8 || .9 || .2 || 8.4
|-
| align="left" | 
| align="left" | Indiana
| 75 || 53 || 26.4 || .443 || .329 || .752 || 2.2 || 4.3 || .8 || .3 || 9.2
|-
| align="left" | 
| align="left" | Dallas
| 40 || 0 || 14.1 || .411 || .379 || .724 || 1.2 || 2.0 || .4 || .0 || 3.8
|-
| align="left" | 
| align="left" | Atlanta
| 27 || 17 || 27.4 || .416 || .318 || .781 || 2.0 || 4.6 || .6 || .1 || 7.5
|-
| align="left" | 
| align="left" | Atlanta
| 42 || 41 || 26.7 || .431 || .429 || .813 || 2.3 || 4.8 || 1.0 || .2 || 6.7
|-
| align="left" | 
| align="left" | Sacramento
| 27 || 11 || 15.2 || .455 || .500 || .818 || 1.4 || 2.2 || .4 || .0 || 3.9
|-
| align="left" | 
| align="left" | Orlando
| 80 || 12 || 18.5 || .404 || .391 || .753 || 1.8 || 2.5 || .6 || .1 || 5.3
|-
| align="left" | 
| align="left" | Orlando
| 31 || 0 || 13.1 || .441 || .333 || .950 || 1.5 || 2.0 || .4 || .0 || 4.2
|- class="sortbottom"
| style="text-align:center;" colspan="2"| Career
| 793 || 249 || 19.6 || .414 || .356 || .745 || 1.7 || 2.9 || .7 || .1 || 5.6

Playoffs

|-
| align="left" | 1999
| align="left" | Atlanta
| 9 || 0 || 12.3 || .276 || .500 || .700 || 1.0 || 1.1 || .1 || .1 || 2.7
|-
| align="left" | 2002
| align="left" | New Jersey
| 19 || 0 || 8.5 || .377 || .100 || .818 || .7 || 1.1 || .3 || .0 || 2.6
|-
| align="left" | 2003
| align="left" | New Jersey
| 17 || 0 || 7.2 || .548 || .500 || .833 || .7 || 1.1 || .1 || .0 || 2.5
|-
| align="left" | 2004
| align="left" | Indiana
| 16 || 0 || 20.8 || .362 || .300 || .773 || 2.1 || 2.1 || .8 || .3 || 4.6
|-
| align="left" | 2005
| align="left" | Indiana
| 13 || 4 || 24.3 || .351 || .348 || .806 || 2.9 || 5.1 || 1.0 || .4 || 7.0
|-
| align="left" | 2006
| align="left" | Indiana
| 6 || 6 || 40.3 || .517 || .400 || .667 || 5.0 || 5.2 || 1.0 || .0 || 20.0
|-
| align="left" | 2009
| align="left" | Orlando
| 19 || 1 || 14.7 || .376 || .300 || .500 || 1.4 || 2.1 || .6 || .0 || 4.3
|-
| align="left" | 2010
| align="left" | Orlando
| 1 || 0 || 5.0 || .500 || .000 || .000 || .0 || 2.0 || .0 || .0 || 2.0
|- class="sortbottom"
| style="text-align:center;" colspan="2"| Career
| 100 || 11 || 15.7 || .404 || .321 || .721 || 1.6 || 2.2 || .5 || .1 || 4.8

Notes

External links
 

1974 births
Living people
African-American basketball players
American men's basketball players
Atlanta Hawks players
Basketball players from South Carolina
Cleveland Cavaliers players
College of Charleston Cougars men's basketball players
Dallas Mavericks players
Indiana Pacers players
Mobile Revelers players
New Jersey Nets players
Orlando Magic players
Point guards
Sacramento Kings draft picks
Sacramento Kings players
Shooting guards
Sportspeople from Charleston, South Carolina
21st-century African-American sportspeople
20th-century African-American sportspeople